Carnival Glory is a  operated by Carnival Cruise Line. She is the second of five Conquest-class cruise ships. As of May 2024, she operates out of Port Canaveral.

Construction 
Built by Fincantieri at their Monfalcone shipyard in Friuli-Venezia Giulia, northern Italy, she was floated out on July 19, 2003, and christened by American physicist and astronaut Dr Sally Ride.

Facilities 
Carnival Glory has two pools, six whirlpools, and a  water slide. The ship also features a 13,300 square foot spa.

Refits 
Carnival Glory was first drydocked in November 2012 for refurbishment.

In February and March 2017, she received a new "WaterWorks" feature, along with renovations of additional areas aboard the ship.

Areas of operation
In November 2009, Carnival Glory was redeployed to Miami. Later in June 2010, Carnival Glory began conducting summer cruises out of New York City, undertaking Canadian-bound cruises. Carnival Glory also has cruised out of Norfolk, Virginia.

In 2014, Carnival Glory  operated eastern and western Caribbean cruises departing out of Miami.

In January 2018, Carnival Glory was the first of Carnival's ship which returned to St. Thomas since hurricanes in September 2017.

, Carnival Glorys home port is New Orleans.

On 2 March 2023, Carnival announced that Carnival Glory will sail a 14-night transatlantic cruise from Barcelona to Port Canaveral. From May 2024 onward, Carnival Glory will sail 3- and 4-night Bahamas cruises from Port Canaveral, replacing Carnival Liberty.

Incidents
He was rescued 8 hours later.

On March 8, 2015, 21-year-old Virginia Tech student, Cameron Smook, fell overboard from a 6th deck balcony. Surveillance video showed Smook climb over the balcony's railing before falling into the water. The United States Coast Guard along with other area vessels conducted a search, but Smook's body was not recovered. The cruise had departed Miami on Saturday, March 7, 2015.

On August 19, 2015, around 16:00, or about 45 minutes after leaving Roatán in Honduras, a 65-year-old female passenger, from San Jose, California, fell or jumped overboard from the 9th or 11th deck. Two hours later her body was found  from Roatán.

On October 14, 2017, at 8:15, while passengers were disembarking in Miami, 8-year-old Zion Smith, from the Bahamas, fell from the 5th floor to the 3rd floor of the Old Glory Atrium. CPR was started immediately and paramedics took her to Ryder Trauma Center where she later died.

On July 1, 2018, Carnival Glory rescued a crew member who went overboard on Norwegian Getaway the day before. A 33-year-old male Filipino was found and rescued 21 miles north of Cuba.

Six passengers on board Carnival Glory sustained minor injuries. The cruise line attributed the incident to "spontaneous wind gusts and strong currents." The restaurant that was located in the affected area of Carnival Glory was closed until major repairs could be done. Despite this, the itineraries for both ships continued as planned.

Gallery

References

Notes

Bibliography

External links 

 

Glory
Ships built in Monfalcone
2003 ships
Ships built by Fincantieri